A.K. Burns (born 1975, in Capitola, California) is a New York-based interdisciplinary visual artist, working with video, installation, sculpture, collage, poetry and collaboration whose works address trans-feminist issues. Burns is currently a fellow at Radcliffe Institute for Advanced Study at Harvard University. She graduated from Rhode Island School of Design and went on to receive an MFA in sculpture from Milton Avery Graduate School of the Arts at Bard College. Burns has been full-time faculty at Hunter College's Graduate Department of Art and Art History from 2015-2016 and a mentor at Columbia University. She has also taught at Parsons the New School for Design, Cooper Union and Virginia Commonwealth University. Burns was a 2015 Creative Capital Awardee in the Visual Arts category and is represented by Calicoon Fine Arts, Galerie Michel Rein and Video Data Bank.

Selected works

Touch Parade (2011) 
Touch Parade is a five-channel video installation about online fetish culture. In the videos, Burns interprets a series of videos from YouTube that contain sexually inexplicit, yet fetishized actions.

A Smeary Spot (2015) 

A Smeary Spot is the first in a cycle of multimedia installations, that uses science fiction and queer politics as a foundation to explore five interrelated elements: land, water, the body, power and the void. Completed and first exhibited in 2015 at Participant Inc., the 4-channel video was shot in the deserts of southern Utah and in a black box theater.

Leave No Trace (2016) 

Leave No Trace is an experimental audio work and poem that uses ambient environmental recordings, vocalization, and sounds generated from various materials, including an electric guitar. It is part of a cycle of related works that includes A Smeary Spot and Living Room.

Living Room (2017 - ) 

Living Room is a two-channel installation that debuted at the New Museum in an exhibition titled Shabby but Thriving, which also included many sculptural works by Burns. It was filmed at 231 Bowery, the building that is set for the Museum's expansion. Using the location's interior environment as well as several constructed sets inside the building, "the video treats the entire building as both a stage and a metaphorical body".

Collaborations

Community Action Center (2010) 

From 2007 to 2010, A.K. Burns and A.L. Steiner composed Community Action Center. It is a feature-length work that they refer to as a ‘socio-sexual’ video, which utilizes erotics to express the personal sexual and political lives of the people in their community, with a largely queer focus. The video was filmed in New York State and Los Angeles. In 2013, Burns and Steiner took the film on a fourteen city, ten state screening tour entitled Community Action Center or BUST!: The X-Cuntry Tour. The tour culminated in October 2013, with an evening performance at The Kitchen, New York. The video was accompanied by live performances of artists from the Community Action Center soundtrack.

The Brown Bear: Neither Particular nor General  (2010) 

During a two-month residency at Recess Activities, A.K. Burns collaborated with Katherine Hubbard, and presented an installation that functioned both as an art and hair salon. They offered free haircuts inside an installation that included an archive of LGBTQ fashion and hair esthetics. Burns and Hubbard organized weekly art salons with live events inviting fellow artist, MPA, Sergie Trecherpin, Corrine Fitzpatrick, to perform works that privileged senses other than the visual.

The Poetry Parade... (2012 - ) 

The Poetry Parade is a series of live events that are an ongoing collaboration between Burns and Hubbard. As a feminist intervention into permanent collections, the artists gather a group of readers, pair texts with works, then read aloud, resulting in a recontextualization of their historical narrative. The Poetry Parade has taken place at the Museum of Modern Art (2012), the Metropolitan Museum of Art (2015), and the Whitney Museum of American Art (2015).

Collaborative publications (2010-2013) 

Burns co-founded and edited Randy Magazine with Sophie Mörner, an annual trans-feminist arts magazine from 2010-2013. Published by Capricious, they released an anthology of the magazine in June 2016. Additionally, Burns has collaborated with LTTR and RIDYkeulous.

Activism

W.A.G.E.  (2008 - ) 
A.K. Burns is a co-founder of Working Artists and the Greater Economy (W.A.G.E.) a New York-based activist group founded in 2008. W.A.G.E. is a New York-based activist group and non-profit organization whose stated advocacy mission is "currently focused on regulating the payment of artist fees by nonprofit art institutions and establishing a sustainable model for best practices between artists and the institutions that contract their labor."

Permanent collections 
Museum of Modern Art

Los Angeles County Museum of Art

International Center of Photography

References 

1975 births
Living people
People from Capitola, California
American women artists
21st-century American women